Valentina Atanaskovski (born 30 June 1963) is a Yugoslav sports shooter. She competed in the women's 10 metre air rifle event at the 1984 Summer Olympics.

References

External links
 

1963 births
Living people
Yugoslav female sport shooters
Olympic shooters of Yugoslavia
Shooters at the 1984 Summer Olympics
Place of birth missing (living people)